The tailspot lanternshark (Etmopterus caudistigmus) is a shark of the family Etmopteridae found around New Caledonia, at depths of between 640 and 800 m.  Its length is up to 31 cm.

Reproduction is ovoviviparous.

References

 
 Compagno, Dando, & Fowler, Sharks of the World, Princeton University Press, New Jersey 2005 

tailspot lanternshark
Fish of New Caledonia
Endemic fauna of New Caledonia
Taxa named by Peter R. Last
Taxa named by George H. Burgess
Taxa named by Bernard Séret
tailspot lanternshark